"Tyce" Diorio (born August 22, 1970) is an American dancer and choreographer. He is best known for his work as a choreographer and guest judge on the Fox television series So You Think You Can Dance. He has choreographed and performed with Janet Jackson, Paula Abdul, Jennifer Lopez, Ricky Martin, and Taylor Swift. He won an Emmy Award in 2009 for Outstanding Choreography.

Career
Early in his career Tyce Diorio was a finalist in the 1988 Star Search Finals as Keith Diorio. He was named "Mr. Dance of America" and performed in a contemporary take on The Nutcracker called "Nuts-n-Krackers" in Boston, Massachusetts, with dancer Nancy O'Meara, also a former "Miss Dance of America".

Diorio performed as a dancer in the 1995 film Showgirls, listed in the credits as Keith Diorio. Diorio was a contestant on the short-lived talent show Fame in 2003. Diorio also had a cameo audition in Every Little Step (2008), a documentary about the 2006 Broadway revival of A Chorus Line.

Diorio was a featured judge on the TLC competition program, Master of Dance, which aired its first six-episode season during the summer of 2008 (credited as Keith Diorio). He has also appeared as a choreographer and judge over seven seasons of the Fox television show, So You Think You Can Dance.

In 2010, he played himself in the motion picture Move (directed by Kurt E. Soderling and Melinda Songer) along with others including Mia Michaels, Paula Abdul, Wade Robson and Nigel Lythgoe.

Janet Jackson, Ricky Martin, Jennifer Lopez, Mýa, *NSYNC, Kelly Osbourne, Céline Dion and Toni Braxton are some of the artists Diorio has worked with. Diorio has also worked on numerous feature films including Robin Hood: Men in Tights, Showgirls, Starsky and Hutch, 13 Going on 30, Mr. & Mrs. Smith, and Epic Movie. In addition to So You Think You Can Dance, his television credits include That '70s Show, The Tyra Banks Show, The Academy Awards, The American Music Awards, The Billboard Music Awards, Big Time Rush, Fame, The Oprah Winfrey Show, as well as Annie and Cinderella. His struggle to be cast in the revival of A Chorus Line on Broadway was one of the stories included in the 2008 documentary Every Little Step.

Diorio has choreographed routines for Paulina Rubio and Tobey Maguire; commercials for iPod, McDonald's, Sylvania and Road Runner DSL; and a musical entitled Just Another Man. Diorio has worked privately with Katie Holmes and Maguire. He also choreographed the music videos for Paula Abdul's single Dance Like There's No Tomorrow and Taylor Swift's Shake It Off.

Choreography for So You Think You Can Dance

Favorite routines:
Season 1:
Melody and Nick's Chicago "All That Jazz" Broadway routine ended up as Melody Lacayanga (runner-up)'s favourite routine she performed of the season.
Season 2:
Donyelle and Benji's Broadway routine to "You Can't Stop the Beat" from Hairspray was chosen to be Donyelle Jones (3rd place)'s favourite routine she performed of the season.
Allison and Ivan's contemporary routine to Annie Lennox's "Why" was contemporary choreographer Mia Michaels' favourite routine of the season.
Martha and Travis' Broadway routine to "Steam Heat" by The Pointer Sisters ended up as jazz choreographer Brian Friedman's favourite routine of the season.
Season 5:
Melissa and Ade's contemporary routine to Maxwell's "This Woman's Work" Mia Michaels' favorite routine of the season.
Top 15 routines season 1-5 choreographies by Tyce Diorio:
Season 1:
Melody and Nick's Chicago "All That Jazz" Broadway routine
Season 2:
Allison and Ivan's contemporary routine to Annie Lennox's "Why"
Season 5:
Melissa and Ade's contemporary routine to "This Woman's Work" by Maxwell was chosen to be Nigel Lythgoe's favourite routine from all seasons 1-5

Dioro has choreographed for the Lifetime TV show, Drop Dead Diva, which featured Paula Abdul and some of SYTYCD past finalists including Mollee Gray(S6), William Wingfield(S4) & Joy Spears(S2).

He was also special guest choreographer in So You Think You Can Dance (Poland) (season 6) and So You Think You Can Dance (Ukraine) (season 4). He helped the judges to pick the top 14 dancers in both shows.

He is also featured as the choreographer in the Taylor Swift video Shake it Off , along another SYTYCD alumni Fik-Shun.

References

External links
Tyce Diorio profile at RealityBug.com

1970 births
American choreographers
American male dancers
Living people
So You Think You Can Dance choreographers